Mavadi Kadepathar is a village in the Purandar taluka of Pune district in Maharashtra, India. Mavdi Kade Pathar/Mawadi Kade Pathar are other variations for the same name.

Notable personalities
 Indian movie superstar Rajnikanth's ancestral origins lie in the village.

References 

Villages in Pune district